"Movies" is the debut single of American rock band Alien Ant Farm, released on January 16, 2001, from their second studio album, Anthology (2001). It was re-released after the success of their second single, "Smooth Criminal". Though "Movies" peaked at only number 18 on the US Billboard Modern Rock Tracks chart, it remained on the listing for 32 weeks, five weeks longer than "Smooth Criminal", which reached number one.

Commercial performance
Upon its initial release, the song reached number 18 on the US Billboard Modern Rock Tracks chart and number 53 on the UK Singles Chart. After the band achieved success with "Smooth Criminal", they re-released the single on November 6, 2001. This time, it was a commercial success in the UK, reaching number five.

Music videos
There were three music videos made for this single. One, which was shot before the success of "Smooth Criminal" features a "behind the scenes" style shooting of the video, with grips and lighting crew interrupting shots to fix equipment, while the band performs before a tacky Hollywood Hill backdrop.

The second video revolves around their playing at a house party, and the imagined events after they each pick up a different girl at the party.

There is a bigger budget re-shoot music video, released after the success of "Smooth Criminal", which shows the band jumping through the screen at a movie theatre, and interacting with the audience in homages to Ghostbusters, Willy Wonka & the Chocolate Factory, The Karate Kid (including an appearance by the film's costar Pat Morita) and Edward Scissorhands. At the end of the video, the entire audience jumps through the screen and joins the band. This version was directed by Marc Klasfeld.

Track listings

UK CD single
 "Movies" (album version) – 3:16
 "Movies" (acoustic live at KROQ)
 "Pink Tea"
 "Movies" (CD-Rom video)

UK CD single re-release
 "Movies" (album version)
 "Smooth Criminal" (live in Denver)
 "Movies" (live in Denver)
 "Movies" (CD-Rom video)

UK cassette single
 "Movies" (album version)
 "Smooth Criminal" (live in Denver)

UK DVD single
 "Movies" (DVD version)
 "Movies" (acoustic live at KROQ)
 "Calico" (live in Denver)

European CD single
 "Movies" (album version) – 3:16
 "Movies" (live acoustic version) – 3:12

Australian CD single
 "Movies" (album version)
 "Movies" (live acoustic version)
 "Sticks & Stones" (live version)
 "Movies" (video)

Charts

Weekly charts

Year-end charts

Certifications

Release history

References

External links
 
 

2001 debut singles
2001 songs
Alien Ant Farm songs
DreamWorks Records singles
Music videos directed by Marc Klasfeld
Music videos directed by Tamra Davis